Kigango (plural: vigango) is a carved wooden memorial statue erected by the Mijikenda peoples of the southeastern Kenya coast. The vigango, which can be stylized, abstracted human-form effigies and are placed vertically rising out of the earth, honor a dead member of the secret Gohu society, or the "Society of the Blessed".

They were traditionally allowed to stand until they naturally decomposed, or they were abandoned and replaced at subsequent village locations by a second generation figure known as a kibao (plural: vibao), thereby transferring away whatever spiritual power was thought to remain from the original kigango. This was a natural result of the Mijikenda's centuries old practice of slash and burn agriculture and, subsequently, the periodic changing of village locations. 

The hard-wood kigango is approximately life-size and may have been painted. Vigango have been celebrated and collected by artists and collectors around the world, including Andy Warhol. Numerous vigango are now in U.S. museums, although some were discovered to have been stolen and were returned to Kenya. However, vigango were openly and legally for sale from reputable art galleries and curio shops in Kenya from the early 1970s until at least the mid-1990s. Anthropologist Monica Udvardy of the University of Kentucky has been particularly active in writing about theft of vigango and their repatriation from US and European museums.

References

External links
 Looted memorial statues returned to Kenyan family by MONICA UDVARDY AND LINDA GILES

Mijikenda
African sculpture
Wooden sculptures